"Bulletproof" is a song by Australian-New Zealand recording artist Stan Walker from his fourth studio album, Inventing Myself (2013). It was released as the second single from the album by Sony Music Australia on 31 May 2013. "Bulletproof" peaked at number two on the New Zealand Singles Chart.

Background
"Bulletproof" was written by Walker, Vince Harder and Lindsay Rimes. It was released as a single via digital download in New Zealand by Sony Music Australia on 31 May 2013.

Chart performance
"Bulletproof" entered the New Zealand Singles Chart at number two on 10 June 2013; the following week, it moved to number six. The song spent fourteen weeks on the chart, seven of which it spent in the top ten. In the week of 15 July 2013, "Bulletproof" was certified gold by Recorded Music NZ for selling 7,500 copies, and in the week of 19 August 2013 was certified platinum, denoting 15,000 sales. It has since been certified double platinum.

Live performances 
Walker performed Bulletproof on season one of The X Factor New Zealand.

Track listing
Digital download
"Bulletproof" – 3:37

Charts

Weekly charts

Year-end charts

Certifications

Release history

References 

Stan Walker songs
2013 songs
2013 singles
Songs written by Vince Harder
Songs written by Stan Walker
Sony Music Australia singles
Songs written by Lindsay Rimes